In statistics, McKay's approximation of the coefficient of variation is a statistic based on a sample from a normally distributed population.  It was introduced in 1932 by A. T. McKay. Statistical methods for the coefficient of variation often utilizes McKay's approximation.

Let ,  be  independent observations from a  normal distribution. Let  and  denote the sample mean and the sample standard deviation, respectively. Then  is the sample coefficient of variation. McKay’s approximation is

Note that in this expression, the first factor includes the population coefficient of variation, which is usually unknown. When  is smaller than 1/3, then  is approximately chi-square distributed with  degrees of freedom. McKay's approximation, for the coefficient of variation is approximately chi-square distributed, but exactly noncentral beta distributed 
.

References

Statistical deviation and dispersion